Haoranjiania is a Gram-negative and non-spore-forming genus of bacteria from the family of Chitinophagaceae with one known species (Haoranjiania flava). Haoranjiania flava has been isolated from activated sludge from a pesticide factory from Xinyi in China.

References

Chitinophagia
Bacteria genera
Monotypic bacteria genera
Taxa described in 2016